The Montgomery County Courthouse is located at Court Square in the center of Mount Ida, the county seat of Montgomery County, Arkansas.  It is a two-story masonry structure, distinctively blending local rustic character with Classical Revival styling.  Its walls are fashioned out of randomly laid fieldstone, but features a projecting entry section with a fully pedimented gable that has an oriel window at its center.  The courthouse was built in 1923 to a design by Clyde A. Ferrel.

The building was listed on the National Register of Historic Places in 1976.

See also
National Register of Historic Places listings in Montgomery County, Arkansas

References

Courthouses on the National Register of Historic Places in Arkansas
Government buildings completed in 1923
National Register of Historic Places in Montgomery County, Arkansas
County courthouses in Arkansas
1923 establishments in Arkansas
Rustic architecture in Arkansas
Neoclassical architecture in Arkansas